Lagos State DNA Forensic Centre (LSDFC) is a Deoxyribonucleic acid centre by the Lagos State Government (LSG), south west Nigeria  to improve the investigation of crime in the state using DNA analysis. The centre is the first of its kind in West Africa.

Background
LSDFC is a laboratory by the LSG to assist the government in scientific investigation of crime. Before the launching of this centre in Nigeria, DNA profiling is done oversea. The completion of the project will save Nigerian government, millions of Naira.

The Project
The project is Public-Private Partnership, where the private organisation manages the facility for two-years and then transfer the facility to the government. On 24 February 2016, the State Attorney General and Commissioner for Justice, Kazeem Adeniji announced that the proposed project will be established to combat crime in the state. The project was commissioned on 27 September 2017.

References

Forensics organizations
Organizations based in Lagos
Criminal investigation
Law enforcement in Lagos State